Anyone and Everyone is an EP from the pop punk band Colour Me Wednesday. This EP was released on digital platforms and CD on 30 March 2016 and on vinyl 7 inch through Dovetown and Krod Records on 12 July 2016. Wiener Records made a tape version of this EP. It was recorded at Dovetown Recordings and at Wingrove Farm in the United Kingdom. It was mixed and mastered by Luke Yates.

Track listing 
 "Don't Tell Anyone" - 03:18
 "Two-Fifty For You Girls" - 03:19
 "Horror Story" - 01:56
 "In Your Shoes" - 03:57

Personnel 
 Jennifer Doveton – vocals and synth
 Harriet Doveton – guitar and vocals
 Carmela Pietrangelo – bass
 Ben Wingrove – sax
 Jaca Freer – drums

References 

Colour Me Wednesday albums
Pop punk EPs
2016 EPs